Saint Peter's Grotto, also known as Farmer South Dakota Grotto, is a Folk Art structure.  Located in Farmer, South Dakota, it was listed on the National Register of Historic Places in 2001.
 
It was built during 1926 to 1933 by Fr. Peter N. Scheier. It has a turret at each corner and one at the top of its dome.

References

	
Properties of religious function on the National Register of Historic Places in South Dakota
Cultural infrastructure completed in 1926
Hanson County, South Dakota
Grottoes